Husumer Mühlenau (Danish: Husum Mølleå) is a river of Schleswig-Holstein, Germany. It flows into the North Sea near Husum.

See also
List of rivers of Schleswig-Holstein

Rivers of Schleswig-Holstein
0Husumer Mühlenau
Rivers of Germany